Alexei Vladimirovich Sokolov (born 15 January 1979) is a Russian pair skating coach and former competitor. With Julia Obertas, he won two Grand Prix medals and placed within the top ten at two ISU Championships. He is the 1998 World Junior silver medalist with Svetlana Nikolaeva and the 2000 World Junior bronze medalist with Julia Shapiro.

Career

Partnership with Nikolaeva 
Sokolov and Svetlana Nikolaeva won gold and bronze at their 1997–98 ISU Junior Series assignments. They took silver at the 1998 World Junior Championships, held in December 1997 in Saint John, New Brunswick, Canada, and placed 5th at the ISU Junior Series Final, held in March 1998 in Lausanne, Switzerland.

The following season, Nikolaeva/Sokolov took silver and bronze on the 1998–99 ISU Junior Grand Prix series. After placing 6th at the 1999 World Junior Championships in November 1998 in Zagreb, Croatia, they finished 5th at the JGP Final in March 1999  in Detroit, Michigan, United States.

Partnership with Shapiro 
Sokolov skated one season with Julia Shapiro. The pair won both of their 1999–2000 ISU Junior Grand Prix assignments and took silver at the JGP Final in December 1999 in Gdańsk, Poland. In March, they received the bronze medal at the 2000 World Junior Championships in Oberstdorf, Germany.

Partnership with Obertas 
Sokolov teamed up with Ukraine's Julia Obertas in the summer of 2000. They decided to represent Russia. Due to her country switch, they were not allowed to compete internationally during their first season but did appear at the 2001 Russian Championships, where they placed 4th.

In their second season, Obertas/Sokolov competed at three Grand Prix events, placing 4th at the 2001 Skate America, 5th at the 2001 Cup of Russia, and 5th at the 2001 NHK Trophy. They finished 4th at the 2002 Russian Championships.

Obertas/Sokolov began their final season with silver at the 2002 Nebelhorn Trophy. They won two Grand Prix medals, silver at the 2002 Bofrost Cup on Ice and bronze at the 2002 Cup of Russia. As a result, they qualified to the Grand Prix Final, where they placed 4th. The pair took bronze at the 2003 Russian Championships and finished 5th at the 2003 European Championships in Malmö, Sweden. They ranked 4th in the short program, 8th in the free skate, and 8th overall at the 2003 World Championships in Washington, D.C.

Nikolai Velikov and Ludmila Velikova coached them in Saint Petersburg, Russia.

Coaching career 
Sokolov formerly coached alongside Natalia Pavlova in Moscow. By 2010, he had returned to Saint Petersburg and was assisting Artur Dmitriev.

As of 2018, Sokolov continues to coach in Saint Petersburg. His past and present students include:
 Liubov Ilyushechkina / Nodari Maisuradze (until the end of the 2008–2009 season)
 Anastasia Martiusheva / Alexei Rogonov (until the end of the 2008–2009 season)
 Ksenia Ozerova / Alexander Enbert (2009–2010 season)
 Alina Ustimkina / Nikita Volodin (until late 2017)
 Amina Atakhanova / Nikita Volodin (beginning in 2018)
 Viktoria Vasilieva / Nikita Volodin (beginning in June 2020)

Programs 
(with Obertas)

Competitive highlights 
Grand Prix; Junior Grand Prix

With Obertas

With Shapiro

With Nikolaeva

References

External links 
 

1979 births
Living people
Russian figure skating coaches
Russian male pair skaters
World Junior Figure Skating Championships medalists
Figure skaters from Saint Petersburg